Nokia 1800 is a mobile phone from Nokia part of the Ultrabasic family, which was released in June 2010.

See also 
 List of Nokia products

References 

Asha 205
Mobile phones introduced in 2010
Mobile phones with user-replaceable battery